Igor Uchytel (born 31 March 1955, in Odessa, Ukrainian SSR) is Chairman of the Supervisory Council of JSC ODESAGAZ, academician of the Academy of Technical Sciences of Ukraine, Associate Professor, Candidate of Technical Sciences.

He served as Deputy of the Odessa regional council of IV, V, VI, and VII convocations. During that time, he headed the Standing Commission for Housing and Communal Services, Fuel and Energy Complex, and Energy Saving Sector. In 2020, he stepped down as Deputy of the Odeska Oblast Council.

Biography 
Igor Uchytel was born on March 31, 1955, in Odessa, Ukrainian SSR. In 1977 he graduated from the Odessa State Engineering and Construction Institute with a degree in Heat and Gas Supply and Ventilation.

During 1977-1978 he worked as a foreman of the emergency dispatch service of ODESSAGAZ. Then he took the position of Рead of the design office of ODESAGAZ.

In 1986 he started working as the Deputy Head of the Odessa Interdistrict Production Department of the Gas Industry and since 1990 – as Chief Engineer of ODESAGAZ.

In 1998 Igor Uchytel became the First Deputy Chairman of the Board of ODESSAGAZ Open Joint-Stock Company. And in a year he became the Chairman of the Board of OJSC ODESAGAZ.

From 2008 to 2020 Igor Uchytel held the position of the President of the public joint-stock company ODESSAGAZ. In 2020 he became Chairman of the Supervisory Council - JSC ODESAGAZ.

Public Activities and Sponsorship 
Igor Uchytel is a charter member of the Rotary Club Odesa Richelieu.

He supported the creation of the museum of JSC ODESSAGAZ and in 2013 he initiated the creation of the football team Black Sea Riviera (Fontanka).
In 2015, with his support, a football section for children was found in Odessa and the same year, Igor Uchytel sponsored the construction of a descent to the sea for the residents of Kryzhanivka village. He supported construction of a kindergarten in Fontanka village in 2018.

Scientific activity 
Igor Uchytel was elected as a full correspondent member of the Academy of Civil Engineering of Ukraine at the Odessa Territorial Branch on December 22, 1998. Two years later, on February 4, 2000, he became an academic advisor at the Engineering Academy of Ukraine.

Igor Uchytel defended his thesis "Study of space-time dependences of the gas pipeline of Odesa" and received the degree of Candidate of Technical Sciences in "Geodesy" at the National University "Lviv Polytechnic" in 2001.

On December 19, 2009, the Academy of Technological Sciences of Ukraine named Igor Uchytel the correspondent member in "Environmental Technologies and Geotechnologies.” And on May 20, 2011, he became an academician at the Academy of Technological Sciences of Ukraine and on June 3, 2011 – at the Engineering Academy of Ukraine.

Igor Uchytel was elected as a full member of the Academy of Energy of Ukraine on December 21, 2013.

Awards 
On September 3, 2000, as the head of Odesagas JSC Igor Uchytel received a diploma from the International Open Rating of Popularity and Quality of Goods and Services Golden Fortune with the title Laureate of the Rating.

On August 24, 2003, the NJS NAFTOGAZ of Ukraine awarded Igor Uchytel with an honorary award of the 1st degree.

Igor Uchytel also received the honorary award of the Odessa mayor For services to the city on August 27, 2004. Head of the Odessa regional state administration awarded Igor Uchytel with the honorary award "60 years of liberation of Odesa region from fascist invaders" in the same year.
The Ukrainian Society of Geodesy and Cartography gave the honorary award For Merits in Geodesy and Cartography of the 1st degree to Igor Uchytel on March 17, 2006.

The Federation of Trade Unions of Ukraine awarded Igor Uchytel with the honorary award "For the Development of Social Partnership" on August 20, 2008.

Former President Victor Yushchenko awarded Igor Uchytel the Order of Merit of the 3rd class on December 25, 2009.

Igor Uchytel received an honorary award named after G.G. Maeazli of the III class on September 2, 2010, and of the II classя.

On April 3, 2014, the Certification Board of the Ministry of Education and Science, Youth and Sports awarded Igor Uchytel the title of Associate Professor.

On December 23, 2014, Igor Uchitel was awarded the title of Honorary Citizen of Odesa region.

Bibliography 
Igor Uchytel is author and co-author of about 200 scientific papers, articles and monographs. In particular:

1. Gladkikh I.I., Kapochkin B.B., Uchytel I.L. Problems of geodynamic risk mapping according to the analysis of the emergency state of gas networks // Ukrainian interdepartmental scientific-thematic collection Geodesy, cartography and aerial photography, 2000, No. 60, pp. 98–101.

2.	Matiko F.D., Uchytel I.L. Modeling of the temperature regime of a gas flow during its flow through narrowing devices. Visnyk Natsionalnoho universytetu "Lʹvivska politekhnika" [Bulletin of the National University "Lviv Polytechnic"], 2003, No. 476, pp. 27–32.

3.	Matiko F.D., Uchytel I.L. Research of temperature regime of gas pipeline sections with variable flow parameters. Visnyk Natsionalnoho universytetu "Lʹvivska politekhnika" [Bulletin of the National University "Lviv Polytechnic"], 2004, No. 506, pp. 245–250.

4.	Kapochkin B.B., Uchytel I.L., Yaroshenko V.M. Variability of deformation processes on a global scale in man-made manifestations. Naukovo-praktychna zbirka "Suchasni dosyahnennya heodezychnoyi nauky ta vyrobnytstva" [Scientific digest "Modern achievements of geodetic science and production"], 2005, No. 2, pp. 89–107.

5.	Kapochkin B.B., Uchytel I.L., Yaroshenko V.M. About the problems of modern geodynamics. Naukovo-praktychna zbirka "Suchasni dosyahnennya heodezychnoyi nauky ta vyrobnytstva" [Scientific digest "Modern achievements of geodetic science and production"], 2005, No. 2, pp. 108–112 (in Russian).

6.	Kapochkin B.B., Uchytel I.L., Yaroshenko V.M. Assessment of geodeformation in the fall of 1998. Naukovo-praktychna zbirka "Suchasni dosyahnennya heodezychnoyi nauky ta vyrobnytstva" [Scientific digest "Modern achievements of geodetic science and production"], 2006, №1 (11), pp. 138–145.

7.	Kapochkin B.B., Uchytel I.L., Yaroshenko V.M. Use of sea level measurement data in geodynamics. Fundamentalni doslidzhennya nayvazhlyvishykh problem pryrodnychykh nauk na osnovi intehratsiynykh protsesiv v osviti ta nautsi [Fundamental research of the most important problems of natural sciences on the basis of integration processes in education and science], 2006, p. 43-44.

8.	Kapochkin B.B., Uchytel I.L., Yaroshenko V.M. Dynamics of slow earthquakes according to monitoring data at the Odessa geodynamic landfill "Naftogaz of Ukraine". Monitorynh navkolyshnoho pryrodnoho seredovyshcha: naukovo-metodychne, normatyvne, tekhnichne, prohramne zabezpechennya [Environmental monitoring: scientific and methodological, regulatory, technical, software], 2006, pp. 50–52.

9.	Kapochkin B.B., Uchytel I.L., Yaroshenko V.M. On the lack of regulatory framework for taking into account the dangers of "slow earthquakes". Monitorynh navkolyshnoho pryrodnoho seredovyshcha: naukovo-metodychne, normatyvne, tekhnichne, prohramne zabezpechennya [Environmental monitoring: scientific and methodological, regulatory, technical, software], 2006, pp. 52–54.

10.	 Kapochkin B.B., Uchytel I.L., Yaroshenko V.M. Anomalous geodeformations in the fall of 1998. – Naukovo-praktychna konferentsiya "Vplyv ruynivnykh poveney ta nebezpechnykh heopolitychnykh protsesiv na funktsionuvannya inzhenernykh sporud" [Symp. "The impact of destructive floods and dangerous geopolitical processes on the functioning of engineering structures"], 2006, pp. 40–43.

11.	Kapochkin B.B., Uchytel I.L., Yaroshenko V.M. Changes in the level of the oceans as a tool for studying global geodynamics. Naukovo-praktychna zbirka "Suchasni dosyahnennya heodezychnoyi nauky ta vyrobnytstva" [Scientific digest "Modern achievements of geodetic science and production"], 2007, No. 2 (14), pp. 79–88.

12.	Uchytel I.L., Yaroshenko V.M., Bauraktutan Selykh. Accidents of gas pipelines of geodynamic genesis. Naukovo-praktychna konferentsiya "Ekolohichni problemy naftohazovoho kompleksu" [Symp. "Environmental problems of the oil and gas complex"], 2007, p. 25-28.

13.	Kapochkin B.B., Uchytel I.L., Yaroshenko V.M. Changes in the oceans level as a tool for studying global geodynamics. Naukovo-praktychna zbirka "Suchasni dosyahnennya heodezychnoyi nauky ta vyrobnytstva" [Scientific digest "Modern achievements of geodetic science and production"], 2007, No. 2 (14), pp. 79–88.

14.	Kapochkin B.B., Uchytel I.L., Yaroshenko V.M. Geodynamic movements in 2008. Naukovo-praktychna zbirka "Suchasni dosyahnennya heodezychnoyi nauky ta vyrobnytstva" [Scientific digest "Modern achievements of geodetic science and production"], 2009, No. 1 (17), pp. 333–337.

15.	Polunin M., Polunin Yu., Uchytel I.L. Heat saving during heat supply from binary heat resources. Visnyk Odeskoho derzhavnoyi akademiyi budivnytstva ta arkhitektury [Digest of the Odessa State Academy of Civil Engineering and Architecture], No. 36, pp. 340–346.

16.	Kapochkin B.B., Uchytel I.L., Yaroshenko V.M., Mityuchenko V.I. Geodynamics of the Black Sea region in 1993-2009. Naukovo-praktychna zbirka "Suchasni dosyahnennya heodezychnoyi nauky ta vyrobnytstva" [Scientific digest "Modern achievements of geodetic science and production"], 2010, Vol. 1 (19), pp. 95–102.

17.	Kapochkin B.B., Uchytel I.L., Yaroshenko V.M., Voitenko S.P. Scientific priority and current study state of the natural phenomenon of "slow" earthquakes. Novi tekhnolohiyi v budivnytstvi [New technologies in construction], 2011, No. 2, pp. 66–73.

18.	Kapochkin B.B., Uchytel I.L., Yaroshenko V.M. Geodynamic monitoring by remote methods. Naukovo-praktychna zbirka "Suchasni dosyahnennya heodezychnoyi nauky ta vyrobnytstva" [Scientific digest "Modern achievements of geodetic science and production"], 2011, Vol. 1 (21), pp. 276–279.

19.	Korban V.M., Kucherenko N.P., Kapochkin B.B., Uchytel I.L., Yaroshenko V.M. Prospects for high-frequency geodeformations monitoring by satellite methods. Naukovo-praktychna zbirka "Suchasni dosyahnennya heodezychnoyi nauky ta vyrobnytstva" [Scientific digest "Modern achievements of geodetic science and production"], 2011, Vol. 2 (22), pp. 212–217.

20.	Korban V.M., Kucherenko N.P., Kapochkin B.B., Uchytel I.L., Makhalov V.V. Satellite technologies for geodynamic processes monitoring. Zbirnyk statey "III Vseukrayinskoho zyizdu ekolohiv z mizhnarodnoyu uchastyu" [Collection of articles "III All-Ukrainian Congress of Ecologists with International Participation"], 2011, Vol.1, pp. 179–182.

21.	Kapochkin B.B., Uchytel I.L., Yaroshenko V.M. Geodeformation process and regional risks. Naukovo-praktychna zbirka "Suchasni dosyahnennya heodezychnoyi nauky ta vyrobnytstva" [Scientific digest "Modern achievements of geodetic science and production"], 2012, Vol. 1 (23), pp. 108–114.

22.	Kapochkin B.B., Uchytel I.L., Yaroshenko V.M. Methods of permanent GPS-networks using for reversible geodeformations monitoring. Naukovo-praktychna zbirka "Suchasni dosyahnennya heodezychnoyi nauky ta vyrobnytstva" [Scientific digest "Modern achievements of geodetic science and production"], 2012, Vol. 2 (24), pp. 195–201.

23.	Kapochkin B.B., Uchytel I.L. Features of the manifestation of destructive aseismic geodeformations. Naukovo-praktychna zbirka "Suchasni dosyahnennya heodezychnoyi nauky ta vyrobnytstva" [Scientific digest "Modern achievements of geodetic science and production"], 2013, Vol. 2 (26), pp. 138–140.

24.	Kapochkin B.B., Uchytel I.L. Classification of fast-flowing deformations of the oceanic crust. Naukovo-praktychna zbirka "Suchasni dosyahnennya heodezychnoyi nauky ta vyrobnytstva" [Scientific digest "Modern achievements of geodetic science and production"], 2014, Vol. 1 (27), pp. 141–143.

25.	Kapochkin B.B., Uchytel I.L. Spatial patterns of fast-flowing deformations of the oceanic crust. Naukovo-praktychna zbirka "Suchasni dosyahnennya heodezychnoyi nauky ta vyrobnytstva" [Scientific digest "Modern achievements of geodetic science and production"], 2014, Vol. 1 (27), p. 144-147.

26.	Voitenko S.P., Kapochkin B.B., Uchytel I.L. Violation of the geological environment cohesion during tidal geodeformations, as a cause of man-made accidents. Novi tekhnolohiyi v budivnytstvi [New technologies in construction], 2014, No. 27-28, pp. 53–58.

27.	Voitenko S.P., B.B. Kapochkin, I.L. Uchytel. Technologies for the growth of geological middle ground monitoring, as the cause of man-made accidents. Eastern-European Journal of Enterprise Technologies, 2014, Vol. 4 No. 10 (70), pp. 31–36.

28.	Kapochkin B.B., Uchytel I.L. The need to take into account the destructive seismic geodeformations in the development of construction technologies. Eastern-European Journal of Enterprise Technologies, 2015, Vol. 1 No. 1 (73), pp. 31–36.

29.	Yaroshenko V.M., Uchytel I.L., Baranyk S.V., Golubenko V.I., Mytinsky V.M. Geotechnical substantiation of high-rise buildings construction in Odessa. Visnyk Odeskoyi derzhavnoyi akademiyi budivnytstva ta arkhitektury [Bulletin of the Odessa State Academy of Civil Engineering and Architecture], 2016, Vol. 64, p. 209-214.

Monographs

1.	Kapochkin B.B., Uchytel I.L., Yaroshenko V.M., Gladkikh I.I. Osnovy neoheodinamiki, merezhi hazoprovodiv yak element deformatsiynoho monitorynhu [Fundamentals of neogeodynamics, gas pipeline networks as an element of deformation monitoring]. Odessa, Astroprint, 2000, 144 pages.

2.	Kapochkin B.B., Uchytel I.L., Yaroshenko V.M., Voitenko S.P.. Heodynamika. Osnovy kinematychnoyi heodeziyi [Geodynamics. Fundamentals of kinematic geodesy]. Odessa, Astroprint, 2007, 264 pages.

3.	Uchytel I.L. Ruynivni vlastyvosti heodeformatsii [Destructive aspects of geodeformation]. Odessa, Astroprint,  2010, 222 pages.

4.	Kapochkin B.B., Uchytel I.L. Zmina paradyhmy suchasnoyi heodynamiky ta seysmotektoniky [Paradigm shift in modern geodynamics and seismotectonics]. LAPLAMBERT AcademicPublishing, 2014, 80 pages.

Thesis

1.	Uchytel I.L. Avtoreferat Doslidzhennya prostorovo-chasovykh zalezhnostey avariynosti hazoprovodiv m.Odesy [Abstract Research of space-time dependences of gas pipelines emergency of Odessa]. Lviv, 2001.

2.	Uchytel I.L. Dysertatsiya na zdobuttya naukovoho stupenya kandydata tekhnichnykh nauk Doslidzhennya prostorovo-chasovykh zalezhnostey avariynosti hazoprovodiv m.Odesy [Research of space-time dependences of emergency of gas pipelines of Odessa. Candidate Diss.] Lviv, 2001.

References

1955 births
Living people
People from Odesa
Recipients of the Order of Merit (Ukraine), 3rd class